Eastern Passage is a town in Nova Scotia, Canada

Eastern Passage may also refer to:

 Eastern Passage, South Australia, a body of water in Barker Inlet
Eastern Passage (Alaska), a body of water in Alaska
 Eastern Passage Education Centre, a Junior high school within the Halifax Regional Centre for Education

See also
 Cole Harbour-Eastern Passage electoral district, Nova Scotia
East Passage
Passage East